PF-610355 (also known as PF-00610355 or PF-610,355) is an inhalable ultra-long-acting β2 adrenoreceptor agonist (ultra-LABA) that was investigated as a treatment of asthma and COPD by Pfizer. It utilizes a sulfonamide agonist headgroup, that confers high levels of intrinsic crystallinity that could relate to the acidic sulfonamide motif supporting a zwitterionic form in the solid state. Optimization of pharmacokinetic properties minimized systemic exposure following inhalation and reduced systemically-mediated adverse events. Its in vivo duration on action confirmed its potential for once-daily use in humans. 

The investigation and development of PF-610355 were discontinued in 2011, likely for strategic and regulatory reasons.

References 

Abandoned drugs
Long-acting beta2-adrenergic agonists
Phenols
Pfizer brands